The Cady-Copp House is an historic house at 115 Liberty Highway in Putnam, Connecticut.  Built about 1745 and little altered since, it is an important regional example of vernacular colonial architecture.  It was listed on the National Register of Historic Places in 2001.

Description and history
The Cady-Copp House stands in the dispersed village of Putnam Heights, on the east side of Liberty Highway (Connecticut Route 21), roughly midway between Wilson Road and Aspinock Road.  It is a -story wood-frame structure, with a gambrel roof and a center chimney.  It is set in a wooded area back from the highway, and faces south.  The interior is virtually unaltered since its c. 1745 construction, lacking any provision of modern amenities such as plumbing and electricity.  The front facade is irregular in arrangement, with an entrance on the right side, flanked closely by sash windows.  A third sash window is roughly centered in the left half of the front.  The left side has a second entrance, set in a gabled vestibule.

The Putnam Heights area was settled in 1708.  Its first minister was dismissed in 1741, and a second was appointed in 1750.  Sometime between these two dates, the Cady-Copp House was built by Joseph Cady for his daughter Damaris, who was marrying the Perley Howe, the second minister.  After he died, she remarried the next minister.  Damaris's son Sampson Howe sold the property to David Copp, whose family maintained ownership until the late 19th century.  In 1992 it was given to the local historical society.

See also
National Register of Historic Places listings in Windham County, Connecticut

References

Putnam, Connecticut
Houses completed in 1745
Houses on the National Register of Historic Places in Connecticut
Houses in Windham County, Connecticut
National Register of Historic Places in Windham County, Connecticut
1745 establishments in the Thirteen Colonies